Coppin Center was a 2,000-seat multi-purpose arena in Baltimore, Maryland. It was the home of the Coppin State University Eagles basketball team and the Baltimore Pearls of the American Basketball Association.  The venue was demolished in 2011. It was replaced at Coppin State by the Physical Education Complex.

References

Defunct college basketball venues in the United States
Coppin State Eagles men's basketball
Sports venues in Baltimore
Demolished sports venues in Maryland
Defunct sports venues in Maryland
2011 disestablishments in Maryland
Sports venues demolished in 2011
Basketball venues in Maryland